The Celair GA-1 Celstar is a South African mid-wing, single-seat, aerobatic glider that was designed by Pieter Celliers and produced by his company, Celair (Pty) Limited.

Design and development
The GA-1 was especially intended for flying competitive glider aerobatics and the resulting airframe was designed to Joint Aviation Requirements 22 standards and stressed to 10 g.

The aircraft is made from a combination of fibreglass and aramid. Its  span wing employs a Wortmann FX-71-L-150/25 airfoil. The ailerons are full-span and mass-balanced. Dive brakes are used for approach control.

At least eight were produced, with two exported to Switzerland and six to the United States.

Operational history
In August 2011 there were two GA-1s registered in the US with the Federal Aviation Administration. US-registered aircraft are in the Experimental - Racing/Exhibition category.

Specifications (GA-1)

See also

References

External links
Celstar three view and photo

1980s South African sailplanes
Aircraft first flown in 1989
Mid-wing aircraft